Black music, des chaînes de fer aux chaînes d'or is a French 2008 documentary film about African-American music.

Synopsis 
Funk, Soul, Rap, Jazz, Swing... For almost two centuries, from the cotton fields of the Deep South to the ghettos in the Bronx, black music has marked the beat of Afro-Americans fight for emancipation. Black American music is a cultural revolution. Its history is political. Its beat makes the world dance.

Awards
The film received the Espace Monde Musicafrica Prize at the 2010 Vues d'Afrique film festival in Montreal.

See also
Black Soul, a 2002 animated documentary about Black history and music

References

External links
Watch the film online at Vimeo (in French)

2008 films
French documentary films
2008 documentary films
African-American music
Documentary films about African Americans
Documentary films about music and musicians
2000s French-language films
2000s French films